Child's Play is a 1972 American drama-mystery film directed by Sidney Lumet. It stars James Mason, Robert Preston and Beau Bridges. The screenplay by Leon Prochnik is based on the 1970 play of the same title by Robert Marasco.

Plot
The film centers on the rivalry between two faculty members at St. Charles, an exclusive Catholic boarding school for boys. Joe Dobbs is an easy-going, well-liked English teacher, while Latin and Greek instructor Jerome Malley is feared and hated by his students. Malley is caring for his dying mother, and his stress is exacerbated by a series of threatening phone calls and written notes he receives. He's certain Dobbs is the source, but his caustic personality prevents him from winning any sympathy or support. Into the fray comes Paul Reis, a former student who has been hired to teach physical education, and he soon finds his loyalty torn between Dobbs and Malley, as he becomes increasingly aware of the latter's personal torments.

Cast
James Mason as Jerome Malley
Robert Preston as Joseph Dobbs
Beau Bridges as Paul Reis
Ron Weyand as Father Frank Mozian
Charles White as Father William Griffin
David Rounds as Father George Penny
Kate Harrington as Mrs. Carter
Brian Chapin as O'Donnell
Bryant Fraser as Jennings
Tom Leopold as Shea
Christopher Man as Travis
Paul O'Keefe as Freddie Banks

Production
Marlon Brando originally signed for the role of Joseph Dobbs, but dropped out of the film when he realized James Mason had the better role. He was replaced by Robert Preston, and first-time film producer David Merrick sued Brando for breach of contract.

The Paramount Pictures release was filmed at Marymount Secondary School in Tarrytown, New York. Students from Archbishop Stepinac High School in White Plains, New York served as extras on the film.

Critical reception
Roger Ebert of the Chicago Sun-Times gave the film 2.5 stars out of 4 and wrote "'Child’s Play,' which is beautifully acted and very nicely directed, doesn't seem to know whether it’s really about the supernatural or not ... the entire movie is set up to suggests supernatural overtones, so when we get a rather conventional, Freudian, ending, we’re disappointed. The original fault lies with Robert Marasco's Broadway play, I suppose. But it could have been fixed for the movie."

Vincent Canby of The New York Times wrote "With the exception of the performance of Mr. Mason, who is fine as the mad, exhausted Latin teacher, everything in 'Child's Play' seems to be rather cheaply tricky — such as the low-range photography and floor lighting designed to throw faces into eerie relief. In a more thoughtful film, the screen play and the performances might have been expected to create the sense of true menace and mystery. Even more irritating is the soundtrack, full of ominous clicking noises that are so loud and so resonant that one can't believe that the characters inside the film can't hear them, too."

Variety called the film "a taut and suspenseful drama," further stating that "Sidney Lumet's direction catches the mood and spirit of an unhealthy situation and he makes every move count," and Mason gives a "solid performance."

Gene Siskel of the Chicago Tribune rated the film 2 stars out of 4 and wrote "Because the look of the film is so artificial, and because the guilty party can be only one person — the only one with a genuine motive — 'Child's Play' is a small disaster as both horror story and mystery."

A positive review from Charles Champlin of the Los Angeles Times called the film "a superior psychological thriller" that "works a few mild deceptions on the audience to achieve its ends, but no one is likely to care very much. Getting there is all the scary pleasure." Champlin added that "Mason's performance, in its power and also in its subtle shifting, ranks with the best portrayals in his long, impressive career."

Gary Arnold of The Washington Post wrote "In a better play or movie we might have learned what makes one man despise another so intensely that he thinks he's justified in destroying him. In 'Child's Play' we get a load of ominous, evil-minded humbug, a vicious dumb show with schoolboys acting like zombie killers, constantly lurking in the shadows and inflicting nasty accidents."

See also

 List of American films of 1972

References

External links
 
 

1972 films
1970s mystery drama films
American mystery drama films
American films based on plays
Paramount Pictures films
Films directed by Sidney Lumet
Films scored by Michael Small
Films set in schools
Films set in New York City
1972 drama films
1970s English-language films
1970s American films